Cuyahoga Heights is a village in Cuyahoga County, Ohio, United States. The population was 638 at the 2010 census.

Geography
Cuyahoga Heights is located at  (41.436202, -81.653145).

Demographics

91.6% spoke English, 4.4% Italian, and 4.0% Polish as their first language.

2010 census

As of the census of 2010, there were 638 people, 258 households, and 169 families living in the village. The racial makeup of the village was 97.3% White, 0.6% African American, 0.2% Native American, 1.4% Asian, 0.2% from other races, and 0.3% from two or more races. Hispanic or Latino of any race were 0.9% of the population.

There were 258 households, of which 33.3% had children under the age of 18 living with them, 31.8% were married couples living together, 23.6% had a female householder with no husband present, 10.1% had a male householder with no wife present, and 34.5% were non-families. 32.2% of all households were made up of individuals, and 16.6% had someone living alone who was 65 years of age or older. The average household size was 2.47 and the average family size was 3.12.

The median age in the village was 40.5 years. 25.9% of residents were under the age of 18; 8.6% were between the ages of 18 and 24; 22.1% were from 25 to 44; 27.2% were from 45 to 64; and 16.1% were 65 years of age or older. The gender makeup of the village was 45.6% male and 54.4% female.

2000 census

As of the census of 2000, there were 599 people, 261 households, and 159 families living in the village. The population density was 186.7 people per square mile (72.0/km2). There were 277 housing units at an average density of 86.3 per square mile (33.3/km2).

There were 261 households, out of which 25.7% had children under the age of 18 living with them, 44.1% were married couples living together, 10.7% had a female householder with no husband present, and 38.7% were non-families. 35.6% of all households were made up of individuals, and 18.0% had someone living alone who was 65 years of age or older. The average household size was 2.30 and the average family size was 2.98.

In the village, the population was spread out, with 21.5% under the age of 18, 6.8% from 18 to 24, 24.9% from 25 to 44, 23.0% from 45 to 64, and 23.7% who were 65 years of age or older. The median age was 42 years. For every 100 females there were 92.0 males. For every 100 females age 18 and over, there were 89.5 males.

The median income for a household in the village was $40,625, and the median income for a family was $54,167. Males had a median income of $45,368 versus $28,929 for females. The per capita income for the village was $21,446. About 2.4% of families and 5.7% of the population were below the poverty line, including 4.1% of those under age 18 and 10.6% of those age 65 or over.

References

External links
 Village website

Villages in Cuyahoga County, Ohio
Villages in Ohio